Nafissa Souleymane (born November 18, 1992 in Tahoua) is a Nigerien sprinter.  She competed in the 100 metres competition at the 2012 Summer Olympics; she ran the preliminaries in 12.81 seconds, which did not qualify her for Round 1.

References

1992 births
Living people
Nigerien female sprinters
Olympic athletes of Niger
Athletes (track and field) at the 2012 Summer Olympics
World Athletics Championships athletes for Niger
Olympic female sprinters